Tavian Remond Banks (born February 17, 1974) is a retired running back in the National Football League. He played for the Jacksonville Jaguars in 1998 and 1999.

College and high school careers
Tavian Banks was a high school standout in both football and soccer at Bettendorf High School Bulldogs in Bettendorf, Iowa, breaking many school records. Banks chose to play for the in-state Iowa Hawkeyes over offers from national powers Miami and Washington.  After being a backup to standout Sedrick Shaw for most of his first three years, Banks became the full-time starter his senior season . Tavian coined the nickname "Big Money" while at Iowa as a play on his last name.  During his senior campaign of 1997, Banks rushed for a school record 1,691 yards and 17 touchdowns, an Iowa single season record that would stand until broken by Shonn Greene in 2008. In the secondgame of the 1997 season, Banks rushed for 314 yards  and scored four times in Iowa's victory over Tulsa.  Banks holds the school record for touchdowns scored in a career with 33.  Iowa finished 1997 with a record of 7–5 after losing to Arizona State, 17–7, in the 1997 Sun Bowl, in what was coach Hayden Fry's last bowl appearance. Fry retired after the 1998 season.

NFL career
Banks was drafted by the Jacksonville Jaguars in the fourth round of the 1998 NFL Draft, the same draft in which Jaguars great Fred Taylor was drafted in the first round. After a promising start to the 1999 season, Banks suffered a major knee injury during a game against the Atlanta Falcons. Banks tore the anterior cruciate ligament (ACL), posterior cruciate ligament (PCL), and fibular collateral ligament (LCL) in his left knee and missed over two years due to surgery and rehab. Banks attempted a comeback with the New Orleans Saints in 2002. He was named to the practice squad in 2003. Banks was placed on waivers by the Saints in at the conclusion of the 2004 season.

Coaching career
Banks served as assistant running backs coach for the Louisville Cardinals in 2006, but decided to leave the team when head coach Bobby Petrino left for the Atlanta Falcons. Currently, Banks is the C.E.O. of Carpe Diem Sports Enhancement in Yorkville, Illinois. He is currently a running backs coach at Naperville Central Highschool.

In 2008 Tavian Banks was inducted into Iowa High School Sports Hall of Fame, and in 2009 he was elected to Quad-City Sports Hall of Fame.

References

External links
 

1974 births
Living people
American football running backs
Iowa Hawkeyes football players
Jacksonville Jaguars players
Louisville Cardinals football coaches
New Orleans Saints players
People from Moline, Illinois
Sportspeople from Davenport, Iowa
Bettendorf High School alumni